The 1946 Arkansas State Indians football team was an American football team that represented Arkansas State College—now known as Arkansas State University—as an independent during the 1946 college football season. In their first year under head coach Forrest England, the Indians compiled a 4–3–3 record and were outscored by a total of 103 to 99.

Schedule

References

Arkansas State
Arkansas State Red Wolves football seasons
Arkansas State Indians football